Concord, Indiana may refer to:

Concord, DeKalb County, Indiana, an unincorporated community in Concord Township
Concord, Tippecanoe County, Indiana, an unincorporated community